Alexander Thompson Kyle (16 April 1907 – 7 April 1990) was a Scottish amateur golfer. He won the 1939 Amateur Championship and was in the British Walker Cup team in 1938, 1947 and 1951.

Kyle was born in Hawick, Roxburghshire, Scotland but his family moved to Peebles when he was about two years old. Kyle learnt his golf at Peebles Golf Club. Kyle moved to Yorkshire in 1931 and was a member of Sand Moor Golf Club, north of Leeds.

Kyle was selected for the 1938 Walker Cup team. Kyle was last out in the singles on the final day, playing Fred Haas. With just two matches unfinished, Great Britain and Ireland led by a point and needed to win of the two remaining matches. The Cecil Ewing/Ray Billows match went to the final hole but Kyle won his match 5&4 to give Britain their first win in the Walker Cup after nine defeats.

In 1939 Kyle won the Amateur Championship beating Welshman Tony Duncan 2&1 in the final. The match was level after 33 holes but Duncan missed a short putt at the 34th and went out-of-bounds at the 35th to give Kyle victory.

Kyle played in two further Walker Cup matches, in 1947 and 1951. He won his final singles match in 1951, beating Willie Turnesa by 2 holes having been 4 down at lunch.

Kyle married Edith Mary Rhodes in 1949, herself an England golf internationalist who represented Great Britain in the 1939 Vagliano Trophy. Edith died in 1959 aged 52.

Amateur wins
this list is incomplete
1939 The Amateur Championship

Major championships

Wins (1)

Results timeline

Note: Kyle only played in The Open Championship.

NT = No tournament
CUT = missed the half-way cut
"T" indicates a tie for a place

Team appearances
Amateur
Walker Cup (representing Great Britain): 1938 (winners), 1947, 1951

References

Scottish male golfers
Amateur golfers
Sportspeople from Hawick
1907 births
1990 deaths